Alberta Provincial Highway No. 53, commonly referred to as Highway 53, is an east–west highway of approximately  in central Alberta, Canada.

From the west, Highway 53 begins at Highway 22 (Cowboy Trail) and ends at Highway 36 (Veterans Memorial Highway), passing through the communities of Rimbey, Ponoka, Bashaw, Donalda, and Forestburg. It crosses the Medicine River and Blindman River west of Rimbey, and crosses the Battle River three times between Rimbey and Forestburg (west of Ponoka, within Ponoka, and between Donalda and Forestburg). Highway 53 also provides access to Big Knife Provincial Park southwest of Forestburg.

Major intersections 
Intersections are from west to east.

References 

053
Ponoka, Alberta